The South Bank is an area of Central London, England.

South Bank or Southbank may also refer to:

Places

United Kingdom
 South Bank, Redcar and Cleveland, a suburb of Redcar, North Yorkshire, England
 South Bank, York, an area of York, North Yorkshire, England

Australia
 South Bank, Queensland, an area of Brisbane, Australia
 South Bank Parklands
 Southbank, Victoria, a suburb of Melbourne, Australia
 Southbank tram depot

United States
 Southbank (Jacksonville), a neighborhood of Jacksonville, Florida, US
 Southbank Riverwalk
 South Bank (PAT station), Pittsburgh, Pennsylvania, US
 Southbank (development), a planned development in Chicago

Arts and Culture
 Southbank Centre, a complex of artistic venues in London, England
 BFI Southbank, the leading repertory cinema in the UK
 The South Bank Show, a television arts magazine show

Education
 London South Bank University, England
 Southbank Institute, Brisbane, Queensland, Australia
 Southbank International School, London, England

See also
 Bank of the South, a monetary fund and lending organization for the Americas